The 2014 Club Season started on Saturday May 17 at Sydney Olympic Park and went through until September 2014. Competitions are held for open women’s and open men’s teams. There is also a schools competition.

The winner of the men's competition qualifies for the National Club championship.

Results

Men's open

Semi finals

Final

Women's open

Schools Competition
The XIX Schools’ Championships were held at Sydney Olympic Park Sports Halls on May 26 (girls) and May 27 (boys), 2014. Many schools participated – the most entrants since 2008 – and all teams improved over the course of each day, with some great handball displays from the seasoned competitors through to the teams who had never played until the tournament.

References

 Men's results - NSWHB
 Women's results - NSWHB
 Men's results on Sydney Uni web page
 Women's results on Sydney Uni web page

Handball competitions in Australia
2014 in Australian sport
2014–15 domestic handball leagues